Vladislav Vladimirovich Kiselyov (born 12 October 1980) is a former Russian professional footballer.

Club career
He played in the Russian Football National League for FC Petrotrest Saint Petersburg in 2005. He then played 3 seasons in the Kazakhstan Premier League.

References

External links
 

1980 births
Footballers from Saint Petersburg
Living people
Russian footballers
Association football midfielders
FC Dynamo Saint Petersburg players
FC Lukhovitsy players
FC Petrotrest players
FC Okzhetpes players
FC Aktobe players
FC Zhetysu players
FC Sever Murmansk players
Kazakhstan Premier League players
Russian expatriate footballers
Expatriate footballers in Kazakhstan
Russian expatriate sportspeople in Kazakhstan